San Paolo (Italian for Saint Paul) may refer to:
 San Paolo, a municipality in Lombardy
 San Paolo, Fiastra, a church in Marche
 San Paolo, Pistoia, a church in Tuscany
 Intesa Sanpaolo, bank of Turin and the major bank of Italy
 Stadio San Paolo, a stadium in Campania
 Basilica di San Paolo fuori le Mura, a church in Rome
 São Paulo, in Brazil

See also 
 Saint Paul (disambiguation)
 São Paulo (disambiguation)